William Henry James Kirsopp (21 April 1892 – 21 April 1978) was an English professional footballer who played in the Football League for Everton, Bury, New Brighton and Grimsby Town as an inside right.

Personal life 
Kirsopp worked as a dock labourer for Cunard Line in Liverpool. In February 1916, 18 months after Britain's entry into the First World War, Kirsopp enlisted for short service in the Scots Guards Reserve. He was mobilised in January 1917 and posted to the Western Front in February 1918, where he was promoted to lance corporal. He was twice wounded in fighting during the Second Battle of the Somme in April 1918, with one of the wounds requiring the amputation of the first finger on his left hand. In February 1919, three months after the armistice, Kirsopp went AWOL from the army for seven weeks and on his return, he was sentenced to 55 days' detention at Wellington Barracks, which was reduced by 9 days following good behaviour. He was discharged from the army in October 1919 and married in 1920. He was buried in an unmarked grave in Allerton Cemetery.

Honours 
Everton

 Football League First Division: 1914–15
 Birkenhead Borough Hospital Cup: 1914–15

Career statistics

References 

English footballers
British Army personnel of World War I
1892 births
1978 deaths
Scots Guards soldiers
Association football wing halves
Everton F.C. players
Bury F.C. players
Grimsby Town F.C. players
English Football League players
New Brighton A.F.C. players
Crystal Palace F.C. players
Oswestry Town F.C. players
Llandudno F.C. players
English amputees
English disabled sportspeople
Association footballers with limb difference
Footballers from Liverpool
English prisoners and detainees
Prisoners and detainees of the British military